The Tucson Festival of Books is a free annual book fair held in Tucson, Arizona during the second weekend in March. It was established in 2009 by Bill Viner, Frank Farias, John M. Humenik, Bruce Beach, and Brenda Viner.

History
The first annual festival featured around 450 authors and welcomed over 50,000 regional visitors. For most recent Festival in 2017, attendance reached over 135,000. The event typically includes special programming for children and teens, panels by best-selling and emerging authors,  a literary circus, culturally diverse programs, a poetry venue, exhibitor booths and two food courts. The Festival's mission is to improve literacy rates among children and adults in Southern Arizona. Since its creation, the Festival has donated over $1.65 million to agencies that improve literacy in the community such as Reading Seed, Literacy Connects, and University of Arizona Literacy Outreach Programs. In addition to aiding the fight against illiteracy, the festival also helps the local community tremendously. In a study by a students at the Eller College of Management at the University of Arizona, the festival was found to pump an estimated $4 million into Tucson’s economy annually. The festival has also been covered by C-SPAN in the past, with over 120 videos in the C-SPAN Video Library.

The 2020 edition of the event was cancelled due to the COVID-19 pandemic. The event will be held virtually in 2021.

Festival Founders Award
In 2011, the Festival Founders Award was established to recognize exceptional literary achievement. Below is a list of past winners:

Gallery

See also
 Books in the United States

References

External links
 

2009 establishments in Arizona
Tucson, Arizona
Book fairs in the United States
2020 disestablishments in Arizona